Zeiad Ali Hassanein (Arabic:زياد علي حسنين) (born 4 July 1997) is a Qatari born-Egyptian footballer. He currently plays as a forward.

Career

Al-Rayyan
Zeiad Ali started his career at Al-Rayyan and is a product of the Al-Rayyan's youth system. On 19 November 2017, Zeiad Ali made his professional debut for Al-Rayyan against Al-Arabi in the Pro League.

Misr Lel Makkasa
On 31 January 2019, he left Al-Rayyan and signed with Misr Lel Makkasa.

Al-Shamal
On 31 January 2020, he left Misr Lel Makkasa and signed with Al-Shamal.

External links

References

Living people
1998 births
Qatari footballers
Egyptian footballers
Qatari people of Egyptian descent
Naturalised citizens of Qatar
Al-Rayyan SC players
Misr Lel Makkasa SC players
Al-Shamal SC players
Mesaimeer SC players
Qatar Stars League players
Egyptian Premier League players
Qatari Second Division players
Association football forwards
Place of birth missing (living people)